Adolf Krzyk (25 December 1907 – 1987) was a Polish football goalkeeper.

Career
Born in Moravian Silesia, Krzyk played football until he retired with Orzeł Niemodlin in 1953.

Krzyk represented both Brygada Częstochowa and Poland National Team (where his main rival for starting position was Edward Madejski). Altogether, played 6 games in a Polish jersey, allowing 11 goals. His debut took place on 12 September 1937 in Warsaw (Poland v Denmark 3–1). Krzyk's last game in National Team was the 4–2 victory over Hungary (27 August 1939, Warsaw), Poland's last before the outbreak of the Second World War.

References

See also
 1939 Poland v Hungary football match

1907 births
1987 deaths
Polish footballers
Poland international footballers
Association football goalkeepers
Sportspeople from Ostrava